The Eternal Return of Antonis Paraskevas (translit. I aionia epistrofi tou Antoni Paraskeua) is a 2013 Greek drama film written and directed by Elina Psikou. It was screened in the City to City section at the 2013 Toronto International Film Festival.

Cast
 Christos Stergioglou
 Maria Kallimani
 Yorgos Souxes
 Theodora Tzimou
 Syllas Tzoumerkas
 Lena Giaka
 Vasilis Dimitroulias

References

External links
 

2013 films
2013 drama films
Greek drama films
2010s Greek-language films